Steve Berryman is a former professional rugby league and rugby union footballer who played the 1990s, 2000s and 2010s.

Background
He is of Cook Islanders, Māori and New Zealand descent.

Playing career
Berryman attended Huntly College and started his career playing for the Taniwharau in the Waikato Rugby League competition in 1993.

Berryman quickly became a Waikato Cougars representative. Berryman moved to the Wainuiomata Lions in 2000 so he could play in the inaugural season of the Bartercard Cup. He captained the Lions, pairing David Faiumu in the halves.

Berryman signed with the Manly Sea Eagles in 2001, playing in the NSWRL First Division. He remained with the Northern Eagles in 2002.

Representative career
Berryman played for New Zealand Māori in 1999, and 2000 before switching allegiance to the Cook Islands.

Berryman subsequently won caps for the Cook Islands in the 2000 Rugby League World Cup.

Later years
Berryman later switched to rugby union, playing for the Te Whānau side in the Central Coast Rugby sevens Festival.

As of 2011, Berryman is the captain-coach of the Toukley Hawks in the Central Coast Division of Country Rugby League and has convinced former teammate John Hopoate to join the club.

References

External links

Living people
Cook Island expatriate rugby league players
Cook Island expatriate rugby union players
Cook Island expatriates in Australia
Cook Island rugby league players
Cook Island rugby union players
Cook Islands national rugby league team players
Expatriate rugby league players in Australia
Expatriate rugby union players in Australia
New Zealand Māori rugby league players
New Zealand Māori rugby league team players
New Zealand rugby league coaches
Place of birth missing (living people)
Rugby league centres
Rugby league five-eighths
Rugby league locks
Taniwharau Rugby League Club players
Waikato rugby league team players
Wainuiomata Lions players
Year of birth missing (living people)